The 2005 Skate Israel was the 8th edition of a senior-level international figure skating competition held in Metulla, Israel. It was held between September 23 and 25 at the Canada Centre. Skaters competed in the disciplines of men's singles, ladies' singles, and ice dancing.

Results

Men

Ladies

Ice dancing

External links
 2005 Skate Israel
 Skate Israel at the Israel Ice Skating Federation

Skate Israel
Skate Israel, 2005
Skate Israel